Acne necrotica presents with a primary lesion that is a pruritic or painful erythematous follicular-based papule that develops central necrosis and crusting and heals with a varioliform scar.

See also
Skin lesion
Cicatricial alopecia

References

Conditions of the skin appendages